The plain-winged antshrike (Thamnophilus schistaceus) is a species of bird in the family Thamnophilidae. It is found in Bolivia, Brazil, Colombia, Ecuador, and Peru. Its natural habitats are subtropical or tropical moist lowland forests and subtropical or tropical swamps.

References

plain-winged antshrike
Birds of the Amazon Basin
plain-winged antshrike
Taxonomy articles created by Polbot